Anton Felix Depauly (30 April 1801 in Mies – 27 April 1866) was a Bohemian painter active in Austria.

Life and career
Born the son of the municipal archivist Johann Depauly and Elisabetha, née Schmid, Anton Felix went to the Academy of Fine Arts in Vienna, where he studied from 1815 to 1826, probably with the help of his uncle who was a merchant in Stříbro. After ten years studying drawing and history of painting in Vienna, he got married and started a family with several children. He worked in the capital as historical and portrait painter, and around the 1840s, he left the city and returned to his relatives in Bohemia where he was still active as a portrait painter.

Joseph Sonnleithner, Beethoven's personal friend and lawyer, commissioned from him a portrait of Franz Schubert where he appears without his eyeglasses for the portrait gallery of the Gesellschaft der Musikfreunde. His work in Vienna, consisting of up to thirteen portraits of composers, now in the collection of the music association, and the ensuing decades of his life in Bohemia where another four paintings were already attributed to him, still are currently not documented.

Literature
 Anna Schirlbauer: The contemporary oil portrait of Schubert has found its painter: Anton Depauly. In: Schubert: perspectives. Vol. 4 (2004), p. 145-173
 Dies: Joseph Sonnleithner's collection in the portrait gallery of the Gesellschaft der Musikfreunde in Vienna. New knowledge about their founder, their images, and painter. With sections about the painter meals, Kupelwieser and Depauly, and details about the history of the collection. In: Wiener geschichtsblätter. (2007), f. 1, pp. 29–64
 Dies.: Der Franz Schubert-Porträtist Anton Depauly und seine Bilder (anlässlich seines 150.Todestags). In: Internet, 25. Januar 2016 [p. 1–9]

References

External links

1801 births
1866 deaths
19th-century Austrian painters
19th-century Austrian male artists
Austrian male painters
Artists from Vienna
Academy of Fine Arts Vienna alumni
People from Stříbro